Beiras is a Portuguese wine region producing wines with the classification Denominação de Origem Controlada. Located in the northern regions of Portugal, the Beiras region produces a wide range of wines, including sparkling and fortified wine. Quality varies dramatically depending on producer and region.

Wine regions
Within the Beiras, the following regions exist at the IPR or DOC level:

Dão DOC
Bairrada DOC
Beira Interior DOC, with the following three subregions:
Castelo Rodrigo, formerly a separate IPR
Cova de Beira, formerly a separate IPR
Pinhel, formerly a separate IPR
Lafoes IPR
Távora-Varosa DOC
Encostas da Nave IPR
Encostas d'Aire DOC-overlaps with the Lisboa VR

Grapes
The main grapes of the Beiras region include Arinto, Baga, Bastardo, Borrado das Moscas, Camarate, Sercial, Fernão Pires, Jaen, Malvasia, Marufo, Monvedro, Periquita, Rabo de Ovelha, Rufete, Tinta Amarela, Touriga Nacional and Vital.

See also
List of Portuguese wine regions

References

Wine regions of Portugal